Ana Milenković (born 19 April 1980 in Belgrade, Serbia, former SFR Yugoslavia) is a Serbian singer. She was a member of the girlband Beauty Queens, which was formed by gathering backing vocalists of Marija Šerifović after victory in the Eurovision Song Contest 2007.

Before Beauty Queens 
Milenković appeared as a soloist at many festivals – Belgrade Spring (2000), Budva Festival (2001), Eurosong (2004) and Zrenjanin Festival (2004). In 2005, she joined the Blah Blah Band. They successfully participated in the Beovizija 2006 and 2007. In 2006, the band won the best newcomer award. She has worked with prominent musicians from Serbia and Montenegro. She did vocal back-up for the big pop star Zdravko Čolić and a very popular singer Vlado Georgiev.

Beauty Queens 
See Beauty Queens.

Discography

Blah Blah Band

Singles
2006: "Maler"
2007: "Rulet"

Beauty Queens

Albums
2008: TBA

Singles
2004: "Takva žena"
2004: "Sad vraćam sve"
2007: "Pet na jedan"
2007: "Protiv srca"
2008: "Zavet"
2010: "Bez tebe"
2012: "Da se ljubimo"

Solo albums
2010:'' "Od sna do jave"

External links 
Ana Milenković Official Site
Vocal coaching program by Ana Milenkovic
Beauty Queens Official Site

1980 births
Living people
Singers from Belgrade
21st-century Serbian women singers
Beovizija contestants